Raoul Jean-Pierre Shungu (born 3 January 1958) is a Congolese professional football manager.

Career
Born in Bukavu, Shungu played club football for local sides Kivu FC, US Bilombe and Bande Rouge FC.

Shungu was manager of the Seychelles national team between 2006 and 2008.

Shungu led Rwandan club side Rayon Sport to four league titles and one cup title, before he was appointed caretaker manager of the Rwandan national team in April 2008. He was replaced by Croatian Branko Tucak two weeks later.

Shungu managed Congolese side St. Eloi Lupopo during 2012.

References

1958 births
Living people
People from Bukavu
Democratic Republic of the Congo footballers
Democratic Republic of the Congo football managers
Seychelles national football team managers
Rwanda national football team managers
Expatriate football managers in Seychelles
Expatriate football managers in Rwanda

Association footballers not categorized by position